Sir John Trevor (1563–1630) was a Welsh politician.

He was the second son of John Trevor of Trevalyn, Denbighshire, and the younger brother of Richard Trevor and older brother of  Thomas Trevor and Sackville Trevor. He served Charles Howard, 1st Earl of Nottingham, as did his brothers Richard and Sackville.

Trevor was keeper of Oatlands Palace, the under-keeper was Ralph Dison.

Trevor represented Howard's pocket boroughs (Reigate in 1593 and 1601 and Bletchingley in 1597, 1604, and 1614) in the House of Commons between 1592 and 1621. In 1598 he became Surveyor of the Queen's Ships, and in 1603 he was knighted. In 1621 he was elected MP for Bodmin and in 1625 for East Looe. He was a Gentleman Usher of the Privy Chamber by 1603 and a Gentleman of the Privy Chamber from 1625.

His son, John, and grandson, also John, were both MPs.

References

1563 births
1630 deaths
Politicians from Denbighshire
16th-century Welsh politicians
Members of the pre-1707 English Parliament for constituencies in Cornwall
Surveyors of the Navy
16th-century Royal Navy personnel
Welsh knights
17th-century Welsh politicians
English MPs 1593
English MPs 1597–1598
English MPs 1601
English MPs 1604–1611
English MPs 1614
English MPs 1621–1622
English MPs 1625